Hosea 7 is the seventh chapter of the Book of Hosea in the Hebrew Bible or the Old Testament of the Christian Bible. The book contains the prophecies attributed the prophet Hosea son of Beeri and this chapter is about Israel reproved for multiple sins (Hosea 7:1-10) resulting in God's wrath against them for their hypocrisy (Hosea 7:11-16). It is a part of the Book of the Twelve Minor Prophets.

Text 
The original text was written in Hebrew language. This chapter is divided into 16 verses.

Textual witnesses
Some early manuscripts containing the text of this chapter in Hebrew are of the Masoretic Text tradition, which includes the Codex Cairensis (895), the Petersburg Codex of the Prophets (916), Aleppo Codex (10th century), Codex Leningradensis (1008). Fragments containing parts of this chapter in Hebrew were found among the Dead Sea Scrolls, including 4Q78 (4QXIIc; 75–50 BCE) with extant verses 12–13; and 4Q82 (4QXIIg; 25 BCE) with extant verses 1, 12–16.

There is also a translation into Koine Greek known as the Septuagint, made in the last few centuries BCE. Extant ancient manuscripts of the Septuagint version include Codex Vaticanus (B; B; 4th century), Codex Alexandrinus (A; A; 5th century) and Codex Marchalianus (Q; Q; 6th century).

Verse 11
  Ephraim also is like a silly dove without heart:
 they call to Egypt,
 they go to Assyria.
 "A silly dove": a proverbial bird for 'simplicity' for being easily deceived, easily be led to evil ("like wax to be bent to evil"; Psalm 116:6), as in an Eastern proverb: "There is nothing more simple than a dove". Jerome wrote  that this bird does not search nor grieve for its chicks when they are missing. Thus  has "How long, you simple one, will you love simplicity?", whereas Jesus Christ uses the likeness of the dove in "be wise as serpents, harmless ('simple'; 'innocent') as doves" (Matthew 10:16). 
 "Call to Egypt": for help, like Hoshea king of Israel asked help from So (or Sabacon) king of Egypt (2 Kings 17:4).
 "Go to Assyria": paying tributes like Menahem to Pul, or Hoshea to Shalmaneser (2 Kings 15:19). The Targum interprets it not as to "go asking for help" but states that "they go captive ('are carried captive') into Assyria."

See also

 Assyria
 Egypt
 Ephraim
 Israel
 Judah
 Samaria

Related Bible parts: Hosea 6, Hosea 8

Notes

References

Sources

External links

Jewish
Hosea 7 Hebrew with Parallel English
Hosea 7 Hebrew with Rashi's Commentary

Christian
Hosea 7 English Translation with Parallel Latin Vulgate

07